Kluane Lake is located in the southwest area of the Yukon.

The Alaska Highway follows most of the south side of Kluane Lake and offers lake views.

Until 2016, Kluane Lake was fed by the A'ay Chu (Slims River), which was composed of meltwater from the Kaskawulsh Glacier, located within Kluane National Park. Kluane Lake drains into the Kluane River, whose waters flow into the Donjek River, White River, Yukon River, and eventually the Bering Sea. The lake has a high density of large-bodied lake trout and whitefish and is known for its fishing.

In a startling case of climate change, over 4 days in May 2016, the Slims River suddenly disappeared, leaving windswept mud flats where the Alaska Highway crosses the diminished inlet. Voluminous glacial meltwaters were suddenly diverted from one side of North America to another — from the Bering Sea to the Gulf of Alaska. With its main water supply cut off, Kluane Lake will likely become an isolated basin within a few years, shrinking below its outlet (the Kluane River). Lack of inflow is rapidly changing the water chemistry and fish populations of Kluane Lake. Clouds of dust now frequently fill the formerly clear air. 

For the last 300 years until 2016, abundant meltwater from the Kaskawulsh Glacier has been channeled by ice dams to drain via the 150-meter wide Slims River northwards into Kluane Lake. Between 1956 and 2007, the Kaskawulsh glacier retreated by 655 meters, which most scientists attribute to human-caused climate change. Meltwater flooding from accelerating retreat in 2016 carved a new channel through a large ice field, diverting most flows into the Kaskawulsh River, a tributary of the Alsek, which flows into the Gulf of Alaska.

Communities
 The Yukon communities of Burwash Landing and Destruction Bay are located on the southern shore of the lake.

Northern Mountain Caribou

The Aishihik and Kluane caribou herds migrate in the area surrounding Kluane and Aishihik Lakes. They are a northern mountain caribou, a distinct ecotype of the woodland caribou. In 2009, there were 181 caribou in the Kluane herd (also known as the Burwash herd) and 2044 caribou in the Aishihik herd. The Kluane herd was declining while the Aishihik herd was increasing.

References

External links

Lakes of Yukon